Telecafé is a Colombian regional public television channel, launched on October 17, 1992.

The channel covers the departments of Caldas, Quindío and Risaralda. It broadcasts from studios in the cities of Manizales, Armenia and Pereira.

Its programming is general.

References

External links 
 

Television stations in Colombia
Spanish-language television stations
Television channels and stations established in 1992
1992 establishments in Colombia
Television networks in Colombia